Cratosoma pictum is a species of beetle in the family Carabidae, the only species in the genus Cratosoma.

References

Harpalinae